There Is No Beginning to the Story is the third EP by Bright Eyes.  The songs on it are fairly varied, with "From a Balance Beam" and "Loose Leaves" having more electronic qualities, while "Messenger Bird's Song" and "We Are Free Men" are more rooted in acoustic. The 12" vinyl edition includes 2 extra songs: "Amy in the White Coat" and a Neil Young cover, "Out on the Weekend".

This album is the 45th release of Saddle Creek Records.

Track listing
"From a Balance Beam"
"Messenger Bird's Song"
"We Are Free Men"
"Loose Leaves"
"Amy in the White Coat" (vinyl release only)
"Out on the Weekend" (Neil Young) (vinyl release only)

Personnel
Todd Baechle - voice
Kriss Brooks - piano
Stefanie Drootin - organ
Orenda Fink - trumpet, voice
Margret Fish - bassoon
Jason Flatowicz - trombone
Simon Joyner - voice, good advice
Jiha Lee - flute, voice
Andy LeMaster - electric guitars, voice
Clay Leverett - voice
Matt Maginn - bass, pylons
Roslyn Maginn - percussion
Mike Mogis - hammered dulcimer, vibraphone, glockenspiel, mandolin, dobro, banjo, bells, electric guitars
Conor Oberst - guitars, Rhodes, piano, voice
Casey Scott - bass, percussion
Maria Taylor - piano, voice

Drum Corps
Clark Baechle
Matt Focht
Clay Leverett
Clint Schnase
Mike Sweeney

Production
Mike Mogis - Recording, mixing
Andy LeMaster - Recording
Doug Van Sloun - Mastering
Zack Nipper - Diorama, layout
Matt Maginn - Layout

Charts

References

2002 EPs
Bright Eyes (band) EPs
Saddle Creek Records EPs
Albums produced by Mike Mogis